While We Live is a 2016 Swedish comedy-drama film written and directed by Burkinabé filmmaker Dani Kouyaté and co-produced by Maria Larsson Guerpillon and Julien Siri. This is his first Swedish film. The film stars Josette Bushell-Mingo, Adam Kanyama and Richard Sseruwagi in lead roles, whereas Marika Lindström, Sten Ljunggren and Philip Lithner made supportive roles. The film was shot at 
Malmö, Sweden.

The film won award for the Best Film by an African Living Abroad at Africa Movie Academy Awards, Lagos, Nigeria. The film also nominated for the Best Editing award and Best Screenplay award at the ceremony.

Cast

References

External links 
 

2016 films
Swedish comedy-drama films
2016 comedy-drama films
2010s Swedish films